Grömitz is a municipality in the district of Ostholstein, in Schleswig-Holstein, Germany. It is situated on the Bay of Lübeck, approx. 35 km northeast of Lübeck, and 23 km east of Eutin.

Grömitz is a settlement on the Baltic Sea. In fair weather one can see buildings on the about 15 kilometer distant shore.

The town name contains the Slavic root grom ("thunder") and means "a place of thunder".

There were three ligers in the local zoo, but the last one had to be put to rest in February 2008.

Notable people 
 Bernhard Ernst von Bülow (1815–1879), Danish and German statesman

References

External links 

 Website of Grömitz
 Ferienwohnung / Vacation Rentals Grömitz

Ostholstein
Populated coastal places in Germany (Baltic Sea)